The Order of the Cross of Liberty is one of three official state orders in Finland, along with the Order of the White Rose of Finland and the Order of the Lion of Finland.

Organisation
The President of Finland is the Grand Master of the Order of the White Rose of Finland and of the Order of the Lion of Finland, and usually of the Order of the Cross of Liberty as well, Grand Mastership of which is attached to the position of Commander-in-chief. All of these orders are administered by boards consisting of a chancellor, a vice-chancellor and at least four members. The orders of the White Rose of Finland and the Lion of Finland have a joint board.

History
The Order of the Cross of Liberty was founded on March 4, 1918, upon the initiative of Carl Gustaf Emil Mannerheim. The Finnish artist Akseli Gallen-Kallela was commissioned to design the Order's insignia with the Old-Scandinavian Fylfot.

At its foundation there were seven classes: grand cross, cross of liberty (1st to 4th Class) and the medal of liberty (1st and 2nd Class). The decorations of the Order of the Cross of Liberty were initially conferred only in time of war. A decree was issued on 18 August 1944 enabling the decorations to be awarded in peacetime. Also in 1944, Mannerheim (1867–1951) was designated as Grand Master for life.

Decorations of the order were awarded in great numbers during the World War II, partly due to Marshal Mannerheim having issued an order that wounded soldiers were to be awarded for their sacrifice, and Finland has no separate decoration for wounded. The Cross of Liberty is usually reserved for commissioned officers, with the Medal of Liberty being awarded for soldiers of junior rank and NCOs.

The Cross of Liberty has a red ribbon when it is granted in wartime and a yellow ribbon when it is awarded in peacetime. Associated with the Cross of Liberty is the Mannerheim Cross.

Classes 

The classes of the Order of the Cross of Liberty, in descending order, with abbreviations are:

Grand Cross of the Order of the Cross of Liberty (VR SR)
Cross of Liberty, 1st Class with a grand star (neck order) (VR 1. rtk)
Cross of Liberty, 1st Class (neck order) (VR 1)
Cross of Liberty, 2nd Class (VR 2)
Cross of Liberty, 3rd Class (VR 3)
Cross of Liberty, 4th Class (VR 4)
Medal of Liberty, 1st Class (VM 1)
Medal for Merit, 1st Class (VR Am 1)
Medal of Liberty, 2nd Class (VM 2)
Medal for Merit, 2nd Class (VR Am 2)

Other special decorations awarded during the Second World War include: 
Medal of Liberty 1st Class on Rosette Ribbon (only awarded once, to Field Marshal Mannerheim) 
Gold Medal of Merit; only awarded once, to General Waldemar Erfurth, 13 June 1944
Cross of Mourning (VR sururisti); given to the nearest relative of a soldier killed in action
Medal of Mourning (VM surumitali); given to the nearest relative of a person killed in non-military duty of war industry or national defence.

The awards above are for civilian accomplishments, signaled by the blue color in the 3rd and 4th Classes, and in peacetime, as shown by the yellow ribbon. Awards for military accomplishments in the 3rd and 4th Classes have a dark gray color replacing the blue, and are awarded with a red ribbon in wartime.

In total the order has 55 distinct insignia. Due to the numerous ways of awarding it has been called "the most complex order in Europe".

Notable recipients

Grand Crosses

 Martti Ahtisaari
 Ion Antonescu
 Walther von Brauchitsch
 Stephan Burián von Rajecz
 Prince Carl, Duke of Västergötland
 Eduard Dietl
 Karl Dönitz
 Adolf Ehrnrooth
 Hermann Göring
 Tarja Halonen
 Erik Heinrichs
 Kaarlo Heiskanen
 Prince Henry of Prussia
 Georg von Hertling
 Heinrich Himmler
 Paul von Hindenburg
 Gustav Hägglund
 Kyösti Kallio
 Juhani Kaskeala
 Wilhelm Keitel
 Urho Kekkonen
 Jan Klenberg
 Mauno Koivisto
 Erich Ludendorff
 Jarl Lundqvist
 Carl Gustaf Emil Mannerheim
 Vilho Petter Nenonen
 Sauli Niinistö
 Karl Lennart Oesch
 Juho Kusti Paasikivi
 Ari Puheloinen
 Erich Raeder
 Risto Ryti
 Aarne Sihvo
 Lauri Sutela
 Pehr Evind Svinhufvud
 Talaat Pasha
 Jaakko Valtanen
 Väinö Valve
 Rudolf Walden
 Wilhelm II, German Emperor
1st Class with a Star
 Ernst Busch
 Wilhelm Canaris
 Rolf Carls
 Eduard Dietl
 Waldemar Erfurth
 Hans Jeschonnek
 Timo Kivinen
 Günther Korten
 Felix Steiner
1st Class
 Karl Allmendinger
 Hans Baur
 Gottlob Berger
 Wilhelm Berlin
 Karl Bodenschatz
 Franz Böhme
 Kurt Böhmer
 Theodor Burchardi
 Leopold Bürkner
 Erich Buschenhagen
 Hans Bütow
 Hans Degen
 Karl Maria Demelhuber
 Erwin Engelbrecht
 Kurt Fricke
 William R. Furlong
 Herbert Gille
 Rüdiger von der Goltz
 Władysław Grabski
 Wilhelm Hasse
 Georg Ritter von Hengl
 Adolf Heusinger
 Otto Hoffmann von Waldau
 Alexander Holle
 Alfred Jodl
 Ferdinand Jodl
 Heinrich Kittel
 Philipp Kleffel
 Matthias Kleinheisterkamp
 August Krakau
 Hans Kreysing
 Karl von Le Suire
 Fanni Luukkonen
 Walter Nowotny
 Friedrich Paulus
 Georg Radziej
 Elisabeth Rehn
 Herbert Rieckhoff
 August Schmidt
 Hubert Schmundt
 Ferdinand Schörner
 Hans-Georg von Seidel
 Karl Weisenberger
 Albert Wodrig
 Kurt Zeitzler
 Arthur Zimmermann
2nd Class
 Eugen-Heinrich Bleyer
 Eckhard Christian
 Gerhard Engel
 Hans-Karl Freiherr von Esebeck
 Nikolaus von Falkenhorst
 Hermann Fischer
 Bruno Frankewitz
 Eberhard Kinzel
 Mauno Koivisto
 Rolf Nevanlinna
 Carl Petersén
 Erich Rudorffer
 Jorma Sarvanto
 Karl Schnörrer
 Reiner Stahel
 Alois Windisch
3rd Class
 Simo Häyhä
 Ilmari Juutilainen
 Paul Klatt
 Einar Lundborg
 Carl Petersén
 Jorma Sarvanto
 Reiner Stahel
 Prince Wolfgang of Hesse
Other or unknown classes
 Franz Augsberger
 Verna Erikson
 John F. "Jack" Hasey
 Olaf Helset
 Harry Järv
 Kurt Kuhlmey
 Rudolph Lambart, 10th Earl of Cavan
 Leonard Mociulschi
 Bernhard Paus
 Walter Schuck
 Hjalmar Siilasvuo
 Arne Somersalo
 Jerzy Świrski

Institutions

The statutes allow the order to be conferred collectively. The following have been awarded:

City of Vaasa

Guard Jaeger Battalion

Field Artillery Regiment 1

Pori Regiment

Jaeger Battalion 2

University of Helsinki

Reserve Officer School
Mothers of Finland
City of Mikkeli

Command School
Air Force Academy

See also 
Orders, decorations, and medals of Finland

References

Sources

Further reading

External links

 
Pictures of decorations
The Office of the President of the Republic of Finland (Decorations) 
Finnish military decorations

Cross of Liberty, Order of the
 
Wound decorations
1918 establishments in Finland
Awards established in 1918